The 2023 Rio Grande Valley FC Toros season is the 8th season for Rio Grande Valley FC Toros in USL Championship (USL-C), the second-tier professional soccer league in the United States and Canada.

Club

}

Non-competitive fixtures

Preseason

Competitions

USL Championship

Standings — Western Conference

Match results

U.S. Open Cup

Statistics 

Numbers after plus-sign(+) denote appearances as a substitute.

Appearances and goals

|-

Top scorers
{| class="wikitable" style="font-size: 95%; text-align: center;"
|-
!width=30|Rank
!width=30|Position
!width=30|Number
!width=175|Name
!width=75|
!width=75|
!width=75|
!width=75|Total
|-
|1
|MF
|12
|align="left"| Ricky Ruiz
|1
|0
|0
|1
|-
!colspan="4"|Total
! 1
! 0
! 0
! 1
|-

Top assists
{| class="wikitable" style="font-size: 95%; text-align: center;"
|-
!width=30|Rank
!width=30|Position
!width=30|Number
!width=175|Name
!width=75|
!width=75|
!width=75|
!width=75|Total
|-
|1
|FW
|23
| Christiano François
|1
|0
|0
|1
|-
!colspan="4"|Total
! 1
! 0
! 0
! 1
|-

Disciplinary record
{| class="wikitable" style="text-align:center;"
|-
| rowspan="2" !width=15|
| rowspan="2" !width=15|
| rowspan="2" !width=120|Player
| colspan="3"|USL Championship
| colspan="3"|USL Playoffs
| colspan="3"|U.S. Open Cup
| colspan="3"|Total
|-
!width=34; background:#fe9;|
!width=34; background:#fe9;|
!width=34; background:#ff8888;|
!width=34; background:#fe9;|
!width=34; background:#fe9;|
!width=34; background:#ff8888;|
!width=34; background:#fe9;|
!width=34; background:#fe9;|
!width=34; background:#ff8888;|
!width=34; background:#fe9;|
!width=34; background:#fe9;|
!width=34; background:#ff8888;|
|-
|1
|GK
|align="left"| Tyler Deric
|0||0||0||0||0||0||0||0||0||0||0||0
|-
|2
|MF
|align="left"| Jonathan Ricketts
|0||0||0||0||0||0||0||0||0||0||0||0
|-
|3
|DF
|align="left"| Wahab Ackwei
|0||0||0||0||0||0||0||0||0||0||0||0
|-
|4
|DF
|align="left"| Erik Pimentel
|0||0||1||0||0||0||0||0||0||0||0||1
|-
|5
|MF
|align="left"| Juan Cabezas
|0||0||0||0||0||0||0||0||0||0||0||0
|-
|7
|MF
|align="left"| José Torres
|1||0||0||0||0||0||0||0||0||1||0||0
|-
|8
|MF
|align="left"| Taylor Davila
|0||0||0||0||0||0||0||0||0||0||0||0
|-
|9
|FW
|align="left"| Frank López
|0||0||0||0||0||0||0||0||0||0||0||0
|-
|10
|MF
|align="left"| Christain Pinzon
|0||0||0||0||0||0||0||0||0||0||0||0
|-
|12
|MF
|align="left"| Ricky Ruiz
|0||0||0||0||0||0||0||0||0||0||0||0
|-
|13
|FW
|align="left"| Wilmer Cabrera
|0||0||0||0||0||0||0||0||0||0||0||0
|-
|14
|DF
|align="left"| Michael Knapp
|0||0||0||0||0||0||0||0||0||0||0||0
|-
|15
|MF
|align="left"| Frank Nodarse
|0||0||0||0||0||0||0||0||0||0||0||0
|-
|16
|DF
|align="left"| Robert Coronado
|0||0||0||0||0||0||0||0||0||0||0||0
|-
|17
|FW
|align="left"| Ian Cerro
|0||0||0||0||0||0||0||0||0||0||0||0
|-
|18
|FW
|align="left"| Duilio Herrera
|0||0||0||0||0||0||0||0||0||0||0||0
|-
|19
|DF
|align="left"| Eric Kinzner
|0||0||0||0||0||0||0||0||0||0||0||0
|-
|20
|MF
|align="left"| Tomás Ritondale
|0||0||0||0||0||0||0||0||0||0||0||0
|-
|21
|GK
|align="left"| Carlos Merancio
|0||0||0||0||0||0||0||0||0||0||0||0
|-
|22
|MF
|align="left"| Jose Luna
|0||0||0||0||0||0||0||0||0||0||0||0
|-
|23
|FW
|align="left"| Christiano François
|0||0||0||0||0||0||0||0||0||0||0||0
|-
|24
|FW
|align="left"| Dylan Hernandez
|0||0||0||0||0||0||0||0||0||0||0||0
|-
|25
|DF
|align="left"| Diego Rivera
|0||0||0||0||0||0||0||0||0||0||0||0
|-
|colspan="3"|Total||1||0||1||0||0||0||0||0||0||1||0||1

References

2023
Rio Grande
Rio Grande Valley FC
Rio Grande